ARToolKit is an open-source computer tracking library for creation of strong augmented reality applications that overlay virtual imagery on the real world. Currently, it is maintained as an open-source project hosted on GitHub. ARToolKit is a very widely used AR tracking library with over 160,000 downloads on its last public release in 2004.

In order to create strong augmented reality, it uses video tracking capabilities that calculate the real camera position and orientation relative to square physical markers or natural feature markers in real time. Once the real camera position is known a virtual camera can be positioned at the same point and 3D computer graphics models drawn exactly overlaid on the real marker. So ARToolKit solves two of the key problems in Augmented Reality; viewpoint tracking and virtual object interaction.

ARToolKit was originally developed by Hirokazu Kato of Nara Institute of Science and Technology in 1999 and was released by the  University of Washington HIT Lab. In 2001 ARToolWorks was incorporated, and v1.0 of the open-source version of ARToolKit was released through the HIT Lab. ARToolKit was one of the first AR SDKs for mobile, seen running first on Symbian in 2005, then iOS with the iPhone 3G in 2008, and finally Android as early as 2010 with a professional version by ARToolWorks later in 2011.

ARToolKit was acquired by DAQRI and re-released open-source starting at version 5.2 on May 13, 2015, including all of the features that were previously only available in the professional licensed version. Among these features are mobile support and natural feature tracking.

ARToolKitPlus (sometimes written "ARToolKit+") is intended to be a successor to the ARToolKit library that is optimized for mobile devices.
ARToolKit was written in C; ARToolKit+ was ported it to C++ to make it easier to maintain, and has a new class-based (C++) API that is intended to be easier-to-use.

Ben Vaughan and Phil Lamb, the former CEO and CTO of ARToolworks, created artoolkitX to ensure that the software is developed and maintained and the ARToolKit community continues to be supported.  artoolkitX is supported by Realmax Inc, a Chinese AR company that develops AR hardware and software.

Features

 Single-camera or stereo-camera (camera position/orientation tracking).
 Tracking of simple black squares (any square marker patterns).
 Tracking of planar images (natural feature markers).
 Camera calibration, optical stereo calibration, square marker generation, and natural feature marker generation utilities.
 Plugins for Unity and OpenSceneGraph.
 Optical head-mounted display support.
 Free and open source software.
 Fast enough for real time AR applications.

Operating systems
The current version of ARToolKit supports Microsoft Windows, Mac OS X, Linux, iOS, and Android platforms. Other versions of ARToolKit have also been ported to Symbian, and Windows Phone to support mobile AR applications.

ARToolKit is also available as a plugin for the Unity game engine for example to align a virtual camera within Unity with a real-world camera relative to a tracked marker target and taking care of communicating with the camera. The plugin supports Unity on OS X, Unity on Windows, Unity on Android, and Unity on iOS.

See also 

 ARTag

References

External links
 ARToolKitX Homepage
 ARToolKit Homepage(404 page not found)
 ARToolKit Documentation
 ARToolKit Forums
 Project page at GitHub
 HIT Lab ARToolkit
 Interactive Media Design Lab.
 Old project page at SourceForge.net
 Project page at Launchpad
 HIT Lab NZ Web forum
  python binding of ARToolKit
  NyARToolKit(ARToolKit Java Edition)

Augmented reality applications
Graphics libraries
Mixed reality